The 2012 African Handball Champions League was the 34th edition, organized by the African Handball Confederation, under the auspices of the International Handball Federation, the handball sport governing body. The tournament was held from November 15–24 in Tangier, Morocco, contested by 16 teams and won by Al Ahly Cairo of Egypt.

Draw

Preliminary round

Times given below are in WET UTC+0.

Group A

* Note:  Advance to quarter-finals Relegated to 9-12th classification Relegated to 13-16th classification

Group B

* Note:  Advance to quarter-finals Relegated to 9-12th classification Relegated to 13-16th classification** Al Nasr lost their four games for fielding an ineligible player

Group C

* Note:  Advance to quarter-finals Relegated to 9-12th classification Relegated to 13-16th classification

Knockout stage
Championship bracket

5-8th bracket

9-12th bracket

13-16th bracket

Final ranking

Awards

See also
 2012 African Handball Championship

References

External links
 Official website
 Tournament profile at goalzz.com
 Tournament profile at handball123.com

African Handball Champions League
African Handball Champions League
African Handball Champions League
2012 Africa Women's Handball Championship for Clubs Champions
International handball competitions hosted by Morocco